The 11th annual 2007 Webby Awards were held in New York City on June 3, 2007. They were hosted by comedian Rob Corddry and were judged by the International Academy of Digital Arts and Sciences. The ceremony saw 8,000 entries from over 60 countries and all 50 United States. Lifetime achievement awards were given to David Bowie and YouTube founders Chad Hurley and Steve Chen. This award ceremony for the first time introduced category awards beyond Websites in the three new super-categories: Interactive Advertising, Mobile & Apps, and Online Film & Video.

Nominees and winners

(from http://www.webbyawards.com/winners/2007)

Honorees 

 Romeo Theater in "Comedy: Long Form or Series" category

References
Winners and nominees are generally named according to the organization or website winning the award, although the recipient is, technically, the web design firm or internal department that created the winning site and in the case of corporate websites, the designer's client.  Web links are provided for informational purposes, both in the most recently available archive.org version before the awards ceremony and, where available, the current website.  Many older websites no longer exist, are redirected, or have been substantially redesigned.

External links
Official website

2004
2007 awards in the United States
2007 in New York City
June 2007 events in the United States
2007 in Internet culture